Juziyah also called Jurniyah is a Syrian village located on the Orontes River in the Subdistrict of the Hama District in the Hama Governorate. According to the Syria Central Bureau of Statistics (CBS), Juziyah had a population of 2,434 in the 2004 census.

References 

Populated places in Hama District